If... is a series of BBC drama-documentaries broadcast on BBC Two from March to April 2004 and December 2004 to January 2005, each of which considers the potentially catastrophic political or social consequences that might arise from current trends in the United Kingdom. Using a drama with interviews from experts, then a discussion of the programme with a panel of experts from both sides of an argument. During the show a televote of opinion is cast.

List of documentaries

Series 1: 2004

Series 2: 2004–05

Series 3: 2006

Production 
The series was filmed with the Panasonic SDX 900 DVCPRO 50 professional camcorder in widescreen 25fps progressive mode.

See also
The Day Britain Stopped
Oil Storm

References

External links
If... website

External links 

2004 British television series debuts
2006 British television series endings
2000s British documentary television series
BBC television docudramas
English-language television shows